Courcy is a commune in the Marne department in north-eastern France. Courcy-Brimont station has rail connections to Reims and Laon.

History
Courcy was a contested village during the First World War. During the Second Battle of the Aisne the Russian Expeditionary Force in France captured the village on 16 April 1917.

See also
Communes of the Marne department

References

Communes of Marne (department)